Parga Formation is a geological formation of sedimentary rock in south-central Chile. The sediments of the formation were deposited during the Late Oligocene and Middle Miocene epochs. The formation's lower sections are made up of conglomerate, sandstone and mudstone some of which is rich in organic material. Additionally there are thin beds of tuff and coal. The formation's composition indicates that sedimentation occurred in an estuarine (paralic) and marine environments. Stratigraphically it overlies the Bahía Mansa Metamorphic Complex and is similar in age and type to Lacui Formation to the south and Cheuquemó and Santo Domingo Formation to the north. It is overlain across an angular unconformity by Pliocene or Quaternary sediments. The formation is intruded by porphyritic trachyte of Oligocene to Miocene age (Ancud Volcanic Complex). The outcrops of the formation are restricted to a NW-SE strip near Caleta Parga north of the estuary of Maullín River.

See also 
 Coal mining in Chile

References 

Geologic formations of Chile
Miocene Series of South America
Oligocene Series of South America
Chattian Stage
Aquitanian (stage)
Burdigalian
Paleogene Chile
Neogene Chile
Conglomerate formations
Sandstone formations
Mudstone formations
Coal formations
Coal in Chile
Tuff formations
Geology of Los Lagos Region